Typha davidiana  is a plant species native to China (Hebei, Henan, Jiangsu, Liaoning, Nei Mongol, Xinjiang, Zhejiang). It grows in freshwater marshes and on the banks of lakes and streams.

References

davidiana
Freshwater plants
Flora of Hebei
Flora of Henan
Flora of Jiangsu
Flora of Liaoning
Flora of Xinjiang
Flora of Zhejiang
Flora of Inner Mongolia
Plants described in 1889
Endemic flora of China